In mathematics, a Perron number is an algebraic integer α which is real and exceeds 1, but such that its conjugate elements are all less than α in absolute value.  For example, the larger of the two roots of the irreducible polynomial  is a Perron number.

Perron numbers are named after Oskar Perron; the Perron–Frobenius theorem asserts that, for a real square matrix with positive algebraic coefficients whose largest eigenvalue is greater than one, this eigenvalue is a Perron number. As a closely related case, the Perron number of a graph is defined to be the spectral radius of its adjacency matrix.

Any Pisot number or Salem number is a Perron number, as is the Mahler measure of a monic integer polynomial.

References
 

Algebraic numbers
Graph invariants